A hammerblow is a martial arts attack made with both hands interlocked at the fingers. The added weight and control (as opposed to a regular punch) allows for a slower, but more powerful strike.

To execute, one brings their palms together (slightly off-centre), locks the fingers downward, then swings at an opponent as if they were holding a club-weapon (like a bat). When performed properly, the strong muscle on the side of the hands can cause a great deal of damage especially against bony protrusions on the face. When grappling, the hammerblow can be performed directly upwards (like an uppercut) and will likely shatter the chin.

Martial art techniques